is a Japanese professional baseball pitcher who is a free agent.

References

External links

1986 births
Living people
Baseball people from Saitama Prefecture
Japanese baseball players
Nippon Professional Baseball pitchers
Orix Buffaloes players